Martin Schmidt (born 4 July 1969) is a German judoka.

Achievements

References

External links
 

1969 births
Living people
German male judoka
Judoka at the 1996 Summer Olympics
Judoka at the 2000 Summer Olympics
Olympic judoka of Germany
Sportspeople from Berlin
20th-century German people
21st-century German people